Hastings (February 5, 1893 – June 17, 1917) was an American Thoroughbred racehorse and stallion.

Background
Hastings was foaled in Versailles, Kentucky and bred by Dr. John D. Neet. He was sired by Spendthrift (Belmont Stakes winner) out of the imported Cinderella (dam of Plaudit, winner of the Kentucky Derby) by Blue Ruin.

Originally, Hastings was bought for $2,800 at a yearling auction by David Gideon and John Daly.

Racing career
Hastings was sent to New York and raced for the partners successfully as a two-year-old, winning several races before the partnership was dissolved by public auction. Hastings was then purchased by August Belmont Jr., for a record $37,000. He was shipped to Saratoga Race Course, but fell ill. His illness may have compromised his form; he finished fifth in his next race, the Futurity Stakes at Sheepshead Bay.

At three, Hastings placed second by a head in the Withers Stakes behind Handspring. He went on to defeat older horses in the Toboggan Handicap.  Then he won the Belmont Stakes, beating Handspring by a head.  His record at four was 12 starts, four wins and six places, carrying weights as high as 140 pounds.

Retirement
He was retired to Nursury Stud outside Lexington, Kentucky and became one of the most successful sires of 1902 and 1908. Of his offspring, the most notable are stakes race winners Gunfire, Field Mouse, Masterman, and Fair Play, sire of Man o' War.

All offspring of Hastings inherited his savage temperament in some degree, even his great-grandson Hard Tack was uncontrollable on the track.

On June 17, 1917, at age 24, severely crippled with paralysis, Hastings had to be euthanized.

Pedigree

See also
 List of historical horses

References

1893 racehorse births
1917 racehorse deaths
Racehorses bred in Kentucky
Racehorses trained in the United States
Belmont Stakes winners
United States Champion Thoroughbred Sires
Belmont family
Thoroughbred family 21-a
Godolphin Arabian sire line